Rangitahi Lake (sometimes spelt Rangitai) is located in the Chatham Islands of New Zealand. It is located on Chatham Island, to the northeast of Te Whanga Lagoon, close to the northern end of Hanson Bay.

In the deeper parts of the lake the vegetation is dominated by the Charophytes Lamprothamnium and Nitella hyalina.

References

Lakes of the New Zealand outlying islands
Landforms of the Chatham Islands
Chatham Island